The Museum Tinguely is an art museum in Basel, Switzerland that contains a permanent exhibition of the works of Swiss painter and sculptor Jean Tinguely. Located in the Solitudepark by the Rhine, the museum was designed by the Ticinese architect Mario Botta and opened on 3 October 1996.

A variety of Tinguely's kinetic art sculptures are on permanent display, complemented with illustrations, photographs and other documents related to the artist's life and work. Tinguely's wife, Niki de Saint Phalle has donated 55 sculptures to the museum. The museum's temporary exhibitions show works from Tinguely's friends and contemporaries, as well as other modern artists such as  Bernhard Luginbühl, Niki de Saint Phalle and Yves Klein, among others.

See also
Museums in Basel
Chaos I
Stravinsky Fountain
'List of single-artist museums

External links

Basel museums website

Art museums and galleries in Switzerland
Modern art museums
Museums in Basel
Biographical museums in Switzerland
Art museums established in 1996
Museum Tinguely
Museum Tinguely
Museum Tinguely
Museum Tinguely
Museum Tinguely
Tinguely
Jean Tinguely
20th-century architecture in Switzerland